Established in 1863, Hampshire County Cricket Club has played Twenty20 cricket since 2003 to the present day.  This is a list of Hampshire Twenty20 cricket records; that is, record team and individual performances in Twenty20 cricket for Hampshire County Cricket Club.

Team
 Highest Total For: 249/8 v Derbyshire at the County Ground, Derby, 2017
 Highest Total Against: 228/4 by Surrey at The Oval, Kensington, 2022
 Lowest Total For: 85 v Sussex at Rose Bowl, Southampton, 2008
 Lowest Total Against: 67 by Sussex at County Ground, Hove, 2004

Batting
 Highest Score: 129* James Vince v Somerset, County Ground, Taunton, 2022
 Most Runs in Season: 710 James Vince, 2015

Most Twenty20 runs for Hampshire
Qualification - 500 runs

Hampshire Twenty20 centurions
 Listed in highest score order. When scores are equal, scores are listed in order of date
 QF denotes a Quarter Final

Highest Partnership for each wicket
Correct as of the end of the 2022 T20 Blast

Bowling

 Best Bowling: 6/19 Shaheen Afridi v Middlesex at Ageas Bowl, Southampton, 2020
 Wickets in Season: 31, Danny Briggs, 2010

Most Twenty20 wickets for Hampshire
Qualification - 30 wickets

References

See also
 List of Hampshire CCC first-class cricket records
 List of Hampshire CCC List A cricket records

Hampshire
Hampshire County Cricket Club
Hampshire records
Cricket